Carola Scarpa (August 24, 1971, São Paulo  February 25, 2011), born Ana Carolina Rorato de Oliveira in São Paulo, was a Brazilian actress and socialite.

She was married to Brazilian playboy . She lived in the U.S. and had an affair with the mobster John A. Gotti in New York City.

References 

1971 births
2011 deaths
20th-century Brazilian people
Brazilian socialites
Brazilian expatriates in the United States
Actresses from São Paulo
Deaths from diabetes